Group D of the 1993 Federation Cup Europe/Africa Zone was one of five pools in the Europe/Africa zone of the 1993 Federation Cup. Four teams competed in a round robin competition, with the top two teams advancing to the play-offs.

Romania vs. Portugal

Latvia vs. Hungary

Latvia vs. Portugal

Latvia vs. Romania

Hungary vs. Portugal

Hungary vs. Romania

See also
Fed Cup structure

References

External links
 Fed Cup website

1993 Federation Cup Europe/Africa Zone